Lushan railway station is a railway station located in the Chaisang District of Jiujiang, in Jiangxi province, eastern China.

It serves the Beijing–Kowloon railway and Nanchang–Jiujiang intercity railway. It is the southern terminus of the Hefei–Jiujiang high-speed railway.

History 
Work on a west-facing station began in September 2020. The new building was opened on 28 April 2022.

References 

Jiujiang
Railway stations in Jiangxi
Railway stations in China opened in 1910
Stations on the Beijing–Kowloon Railway